Death Valley Manhunt is a 1943 American Western film directed by John English and written by Norman S. Hall and Anthony Coldeway. The film stars Wild Bill Elliott, George "Gabby" Hayes, Anne Jeffreys, Weldon Heyburn, Herbert Heyes and Davison Clark. The film was released on November 24, 1943, by Republic Pictures.

Plot
Marshall Wild Bill Elliot pursues a retirement of ranching after enjoying a successful career. Elliot's friend, Gabby Hayes tries to get him to go to Death Valley, where Hayes owns land used for oil drilling. Elliot declines the offer but Hayes travels to the area with his dog, Teabone. Whilst in the nearby town, Hayes speaks with his friend and fellow oil driller Tex Benson, who warns him not to come into contact with a certain Richard Quinn, the field manager of another oil extraction company who has secret attempts to sabotage smaller oil companies.

Following an attack on his well by Quinn's henchmen, Benson proceeds to steal equipment from Quinn's own well. Quinn then takes Benson to court where Judge Jim Hobart (who reluctantly works for Quinn) issues an arrest warrant for Benson. Marshall Hugh Ward is sent to arrest Benson, but ends up being killed accidentally. Quinn claims the death was a murder by Benson and has him imprisoned by Hobart.

Cast  
Wild Bill Elliott as Marshal Wild Bill Elliott
George "Gabby" Hayes as Gabby Hayes
Anne Jeffreys as Nicky Hobart
Weldon Heyburn as Richard Quinn
Herbert Heyes as Judge Jim Hobart
Davison Clark as Tex Benson
Pierce Lyden as Clayton
Charles Murray Jr. as Danny 
Jack Kirk as Marshal Hugh Ward
Eddie Phillips as Deputy Marshal Blaine
Bud Geary as Henchman Sid Roberts
Al Taylor as Deputy Marshal Lawson

References

External links
 

1943 films
American Western (genre) films
1943 Western (genre) films
Republic Pictures films
Films directed by John English
American black-and-white films
1940s English-language films
1940s American films